Nicolas Garrault (born 15 June 1991) is a French rugby union player. He currently plays at back row for Stade Montois in the Rugby Pro D2.

References

External links
Ligue Nationale De Rugby Profile
European Professional Club Rugby Profile
Stade Français Profile

Living people
1991 births
French rugby union players